Von Simolin is a noble family of Finnish origin. It descends from a burgher in Turku, whose Finnish surname Simola was changed to Swedish sounding Simolin by his son, who became a Lutheran pastor in Tallinn.

History 
In earlier genealogical literature it was often stated that the family had its origins in Transylvania, now in Romania, connected with the Hungarian noble Báthory family.

Brothers Carl Gustav von Simolin and Johann Matthias von Simolin were ennobled in Holy Roman Empire. The Simolin family possessed large estates in Prussia and Courland and members served the Russian Empresses Elizabeth and Catherine as diplomats.

Court marshal Robert Freiherr von Simolin (b. 1851) took name Simolin-Bathory.

Sources

External links
 Genealogisches Handbuch der baltischen Ritterschaften: Teil Kurland

Families of Finnish ancestry
Noble families of the Holy Roman Empire
Polish noble families
Baltic nobility